The Most Puissant Order of the Gorkha Dakshina Bahu (Order of the Gurkha Right Arm or Hand) was an order of knighthood of Nepal. It was one of the highest honors given traditionally by the king. It was awarded to both the military and civilians, including foreign nationals, for distinguished contribution to the country in the field of arts, literature, sports, science, and social service. It was the second highest honor of the Kingdom of Nepal after the Order of Tri Shakti Patta; the award was discontinued after the fall of monarchy in 2008.

History 
The order was first instituted by King Prithvi Bir Bikram Shah Dev in 1896. The order was later revived and reformed on 7 September 1932 by King Tribhuvan Bir Bikram Shah Dev. Attached to the order is a medal instituted by King Tribhuvan in 1936. It is the oldest order in Nepal.

Insignia
The ribbon of the order is officially saffron.

Grades
The Order of Gorkha Dakshina Bahu has five classes and a medal:
 Member First Class (Suprasidha-Prabala-Gorkha-Dakshina-Bahu)
 Member Second Class (Prasidha-Prabala-Gorkha-Dakshina-Bahu)
 Member Third Class (Suprabala-Gorkha-Dakshina-Bahu)
 Member Fourth Class (Prabala-Gorkha-Dakshina-Bahu)
 Member Fifth Class (Gorkha-Dakshina-Bahu)
 Medal (Gorkha-Dakshina-Bahu-Padak)

References

External links
 World Medals Index, Nepal: The Most Puissant Order of the Gurkha Right Arm

 
Gorkha Dakshina Bahu, Order of
Gurkhas
Awards established in 1896
1896 establishments in Nepal
2006 disestablishments in Nepal